Thanasis Veggos (alternatively spelt Thanassis and/or Vengos; Greek: Θανάσης Βέγγος; pronounced: Thanássis Véngos; 29 May 19273 May 2011) was a Greek actor and director born in Neo Faliro, Piraeus. He performed in around 130 films, predominantly comedies in the 1950s, 1960s, and 1970s, starring in more than 50 among them. He is considered one of the best Greek comedy actors of all time.

Background
Veggos was the only son of a power station employee, who had fought with the Greek Resistance in World War II. Vassilis Veggos played an important part in the defense of the Piraeus power station when the Germans attempted to destroy it before departing in 1944, but precisely because of this was dismissed from his job in the post-war purge of leftists. His real surname was Βέγκος and, as he had said, he wrote it with ''γγ'' because it looked better in the eyes. Veggos himself was a member of EPON, the youth branch of the left-wing resistance movement EAM, and so served his compulsory military service as an inmate on the notorious prison island Makronisos from 1948 to 1950. On Makronisos he met film director Nikos Koundouros who was also exiled there.

Career 
Veggos' first appearance in a film was in Windfall in Athens, produced by Michael Cacoyannis, which premiered in Athens as Kiriakatiko Xsipnima on 11 January 1954. Nikos Koundouros gave him a role in Magiki polis in 1954. His first major role was in Psila ta heria Hitler ("Hands Up, Hitler"), 1962. and continued many more films. For his acting in What did you do in the war, Thanasi? (1971), the public of Thessaloniki apotheosized him and the movie won three awards at the Thessaloniki International Film Festival. He often played everyman characters struggling to get by, but he has also played anti-heroes, he has acted in pure dramas, and on stage in the comedies of Aristophanes. His characters were often self-named "Thanasis". He often worked with directors Panos Glykofridis and Giorgos Lazaridis. In 1995, Theo Angelopoulos cast Veggos and American actor Harvey Keitel in "Ulysses Gaze". In 1997, in the role of Dikaiopoli he appeared in a live performance at the ancient Epidaurus theatre. In 2000, he survived a car accident involving a collision with a train. He later participated in advertisements promoting road safety.

A documentary of his life, whose title translates as A Man for All Seasons, was made in 2004. He always did his own stunts including the most dangerous ones, like hanging from a rope tied to a balcony fifty feet above a pavement without anything to break his fall, walking through a glass door, or falling down a stone staircase head first. During the "Golden Sixties" of the Greek film industry he made his most popular comedy films such as the sequel of Secret Agent 000, Papatrehas,  and many others, also with surrealist humor, most of them by his own company Θ-Β Comedies (Θ-Β Tainies Geliou) which he founded in 1964.

In 2008, Veggos was appointed Commander of the Order of the Phoenix by the President of Greece, Karolos Papoulias.

On 3 May 2011, he died at 7:10 a.m. He had been hospitalized at the Red Cross hospital, in Athens, since 18 December 2010.

Personal life
Thanasis Veggos was married to Asimina and they had two sons. He will always be remembered in more than 120 films and documentaries that he has starred in. The phrase "τρέχει σαν το Βέγγο" (English translation: "runs like Veggos") has been adopted into common usage in the Greek language since nobody has run more or faster than Veggos in his many slapstick comedies.

Honors and awards 
 1962, Hellenic Association of Film Critics Award, from Hellenic Critics Association
 1971, Best Actor Award, from 12th Thessaloniki Festival of Greek Cinema for the film What Did You Do in the War, Thanasis?
 1971, Hellenic Association of Film Critics Award, from Hellenic Critics Association for the film What Did You Do in the War, Thanasis?  
 1972, Best Actor Award, from 13th Thessaloniki Festival of Greek Cinema for the film Thanasis Take Your Gun
 1973, Best Actor Award, from 14th Thessaloniki Festival of Greek Cinema for the film The Charlatan
 1991, Audience Award, from the Thessaloniki Festival of Greek Cinema for the film The Calm Days of August
 1993, Lifetime Achievement Award, from the Thessaloniki Festival of Greek Cinema
 2002, Honoree, Municipality of Korydallos Theatre was named Thanasis Veggos Theatre from the Municipality of Korydallos, Attica
 2008, Honoree, Evangelismou Square was named Thanasis Veggos Square from the Municipality of Piraeus, Attica 
 2008, Commander of the Order of the Phoenix, from the President of Greece Karolos Papoulias
 2008, Faces Award, from the TV Magazine of Ethnos 
 2010, Lifetime Achievement Award, from the Status Magazine
 2010, Lifetime Achievement Award, from the Hellenic Film Academy

Filmography

Early movies

 Kiriakatiko Xsipnima (premiered 1954), Windfall in Athens (1956)
 Magiki Polis (1955), Magic City 
 Katadikasmeni ki apo to paidi tis (1955), Condemned even by her child
 O Drakos (1956), The dragon
 Oi assoi ton gipedon (1956), The aces of the playground
 To koritsi me ta mavra (1956), A Girl in Black
 Echei theio to koritsi  (1956), The girl has an uncle
 To koritsi me ta paramythia (1957), Fairytale girl
 Tsarouhi, pistoli, papillon (1957), Tsarouhi, pistol, bow tie
 Maria i Pentagiotissa (1957), Maria the Pentagiotissa
 Tis tyhis ta grammena (1957 Greek film) (1957)
 I ftocheia thelei kaloperasi (1958), Having a good time in poverty
 To eispraktoraki (1958),  The little  money collector
 Diakopes stin Aigina (1958), Holidays in Aegina
 Oi kavgatzides (1958), The brawlers
 Mono gia mia nychta (1958), Only for one night
 Haroumenoi alites (1958), Happy streetboys
 O Mimikos kai Mairi (1958),  Mimikos and Mairy 
 To koritsi tis amartias (1958), The girl of sin
 O Karagiozis (1959),  Mr. Punch
 Gamilies Peripeteies (1959), Nuptial Adventures
 I mousitsa (1959), The cunning jade
 Anthismeni amigdalia (1959), Blooming almond tree
 Ena nero Kyra Vaggelio (1959), Gimme some water Kyra Vaggelio
 O Ilias tou 16ou (1959), Ilias of 16th precinct
 Gia to psomi kai ton erota  (1959), For the bread and love
 Oi dosatzides (1959), The tallymen
 Enas Ellinas sto Parisi (1959), A Greek in Paris
 To agorokoritso (1959 ), The tomboy
 O theios apo ton Kanada (1959), The uncle from Canada
 Periplanomenoi Ioudaioi (1959), Wandering Jewes
 To rantevou tis Kyriakis (1960), The Sunday appointment
 Ta dervisopaida (1960), The dervish boys
 To klotsoskoufi (1960), The plaything
 Madalena (film) (1960), Madalena
 Pothoi sta stachya (1960), Desires in the hay
 Erotika paichnidia (1960), Erotic games
 Pote tin Kyriaki (1960), Never on a Sunday
 Treis koukles ki ego (1960), Three dolls and me
 Oikogeneia Papadopoulou  (1960), The Papadopoulos family
 O Mitros ki o Mitrousis stin Athina (1960), Mitros and Mitrousis in Athens
 Tyflos Aggelos (1960), Blind Angel
 I avgi tou thriamvou (1961), The dawn of triumph
 Oi enniakosioi tis Marinas (1961), The nine hundred of Marina
 Gia sena tin agapi mou (1961), For you my love
 Mia tou klefti (1961), Once a thief
 Horis mitera (1961), Without a mother 
 Poios tha krinei tin koinonia ; (1961), Who will judge  society ?
 Diavolou kaltsa (1961), Cunning woman
 I katara tis manas (1961), The mothers curse
 Hamena oneira (1961), Lost dreams
 Ziteitai pseftis (1961), Lier wanted
 Lathos ston erota (1961), Fault in love
 I myrtia (1961), The myrtle
 Diamado (1961), Diamado
 Eftychos trelathika (1961), Fortunately I went nuts
 Poia einai i Margarita; (1961), Who is Margarita?
 Liza ki i alli (1961), Liza and the other girl
 Doulepste gia na fate (1961),  Work to eat
 O atsidas (1962), The smart one
 Douleies tou podariou (1962), Odd jobs
 To pithari (1962), The earthenware jar
 Yperochi optasia (1962), Beautiful illusion
 I nyfi to 'skase (1962)
 Oi yperifanoi (1962), The proud ones

Leading roles
 Psila ta heria, Hitler (1962), Stick them up, Hitler
 Zito i trela (1962 ), Hurrah for madness
 Vasilias tis gafas  (1962), King of gaff
 Astronaftes gia desimo (1962), Silly astronauts 
 Min ton eidate ton Panai; (1962), Anyone saw Panais?
 Gabros gia klamata (1962), Pathetic son-in-law 
 Anisycha niata (1963), Anxious youth
 O Ippolytos kai to violi tou (1963),  Ippolytos and his violin
 Tyfla na'chei o Marlon Brando (1963), Marlon Brando doesn't compare
 Polytehnitis kai erimospitis (1963), Jack of all trades and master of none
 O trelaras (1963), The nutcase
 To tixero panteloni (1963), Lucky pants
 Scholi gia soferines (1964), School for women drivers 
 Oi ftochodiavoloi (1964), The poor demons
 O polyteknos (1964), Father of many children
 Exo i ftocheia kai i kali kardia (1964), Poverty and  gentle heart
 Tha se kano vasilissa (1964), I will make you a queen
 Ta Didyma (1964), The Twins
 O Katafertzis (1964), The hustler
 Einai enas trelos ... trelos Veggos (1965), He is one crazy ... crazy Veggos
 O Papatrehas (1966), The babbler
 Voitheia! O Vengos faneros praktor 000 (1967), Out-in-the-open Agent 000
 Pare kosme (1967), For all to take
 Trelos, palavos kai Vengos (1967), Crazy , daft and Veggos
 Doktor Zi - Veggos (1968), Doctor Zi - Veggos
 Poios Thanasis ; (1969), Thanasis who?
 Ena asyllipto koroido (1969), An amazing dupe
 Thou-Vou falakros praktor, epiheirisis "Yis Mathiam" (1969), Thou-Vou bald agent, operation havoc
 Enas Veggos gia oles tis douleies (1970), One Veggos for all the trades
 O Thanasis, i Ioulieta kai ta loukanika (1970), Thanasis, Juliette and the sausages
 Diakopes sto Vietnam (1971), Holidays in Vietnam
 Ti ekanes sto polemo Thanasi; (1971), What did you do during the war Thanasis?
 Enas xegnoiastos palaviaris (1971), One carefree wacko
 Thanasi pare to oplo sou (1972), Thanassis, take your gun
 O anthropos pou etreche poly (1973), The man who ran too much
 Diktator kalei Thanasi (1973), Dictator calls Thanasis
 O tsarlatanos (1973), The charlatan
 O grylos (1975), The jack
 O Thanasis sti hora tis sfaliaras (1976), Thanasis in the land of slap
 Apo pou pane gia tin havouza ; (1978), What's the way to the refuse dump ?
 O palavos kosmos tou Thanasi (1979), The batty world of Thanasis
 O falakros mathitis (1979), The bald - headed student
 Thanasi sfixe ki allo to zonari (1980), Thanasis tighten up your belt
 O trelos kamikazi (1980), The mad kamikaze
 To megalo kanoni (1981), The big cannon
 O Thanasis kai to katarameno fidi (1982), Thanasis and the accursed serpent
 Trelos kai pasis Ellados (1983), Daffy of all Greece
 Made In Greece (1987) ft. Harry Klynn
 O Thanasis sti hora tou "tha" (1988), Thanasis in the country of "shall"'
 Trelokomeion i Ellas (1988), Mad house Greece To didymo tis symforas (1989), The duo of misfortune Ypastynomos Thanasis (1989), Police lieutenant Thanassis O protathlitis (1989), The champion Prosohi ... mas valane boba (1990), Attention ... they set us a bomb Isyhes meres tou Avgustou (1991), The calm days of August Zoi harisameni (1993), Pleasant life Vimata (1996), Steps To vlemma tou Odyssea (1997), Ulysses' Gaze
 Ola einai dromos (1998), Everything is a journey To ainigma (1998), The riddle The Lilly's Story (2002)
 Psychi vathia (2009), A Soul So Deep The Flight of the Swan (2010)
 World War III (3D cartoon) (2011)

Television series
Veggos also played roles in televisual series in the 1990s and 2000s; these were mainly roles of an elder wise person, who gives his advice to the younger ones.

 Ta veggalika (1985) ERT
 Astynomos Thanasis Papathanasis ( 1990 ) ANT1 channel, Police commissioner Thanasis Papathanasis Peri anemon kai ydaton ( 2002 ) Mega channel, About everything Erotas, opos i erimos ( 2003 ) NET channel, Love , like the desert Kathrefti, kathreftaki mou ( 2006 ) ANT1 channel, Mirror Mirror Exo ena mystiko (2008) Alpha TV, I Have a Secret O Grylos Film 
O grylos is a 1973 Greek film, which was filmed in 1975 and its first screening was on Hellenic Radio Television 1 in 1976. This film premiered in 27 August 1973 by bgrego, in the cinemas on 15 January 1989 and on the Smart TVs on 26 June 2019, 06:37 p.m. It was filmed at the Erythros Stavros hospital, where Thanasis Veggos died. Starring: Ioulios Tilepoulios, Thanasis Veggos, Lambros Konstantaras, Aliki Vougiouklaki, Manos Katrakis, Giannis Malouhos, Katerina Yioulaki and Dimitris Nikolaidis.

Theatrical performances and troupes

Performances
 O trelos tou louna park kai i atsida ( 1959–70 ),  The madman of  the entertainment park and the wizard Okto andres katigoroundai ( 1963 ), Eight men accused Kokkina triandafylla ( 1963 ), Red roses Oi ftohodiavoloi ( 1963 ), The poor demons Arhodorebetissa ( 1963–64 ), Lady rebetis Kypros yiok ( 1963–64 ), Cyprus gone Ti ekanes ston Troiko polemo Thanasi ; ( 1971 ), What did you do during the Trojan War Thanasis ?  To vlima ( 1972 ), The missile Mam, kaka, koko kai nani ( 1975 ), Eat, poop, shag and sleep Peace of Aristophanes ( 1995 )
 Ellin exastheneis ( 1997 ), Greece  you are losing your senses Acharnians of Aristophanes ( 1998 )
 Ellines eiste kai faineste ( 1998–99 ), Greek is a Greek doesTroupes
 Mandoubala
 Kainourgia Athina, New Athens Anthropoi tou ' 60, People of ' 60''

References

External links
 
  at 90lepta.com
  at retrodb.gr
 

1926 births
2011 deaths
Actors from Piraeus
Greek male film actors
Greek male actors
Greek film directors
Commanders of the Order of the Phoenix (Greece)
Greek male comedians